Eugène Tucherer (1899–1974) was a film producer. He was born in the Austro-Hungarian Empire but settled and worked in France for much of his career.

Selected filmography
 Gold in the Street (1934)
 Chaste Susanne (1937)
 The Girl in the Taxi (1937)
 The Train for Venice (1938)
 Crossroads (1938)
 Sarajevo (1940)
 Star Without Light (1946)
 Dilemma of Two Angels (1948)
 House on the Waterfront (1955)
 Vice Squad (1959)
 The Cat Shows Her Claws (1960)
 Girl on the Road (1962)
 The Dirty Game (1965)

References

Bibliography
 Hayward, Susan. Simone Signoret: The Star as Cultural Sign. A&C Black, 2004.

External links

1899 births
1974 deaths
French film producers
Austrian film producers
Austro-Hungarian emigrants to France